The Vornic is a right tributary of the river Bârzava in Romania. It flows into the Bârzava near Berzovia.

References

Rivers of Romania
Rivers of Caraș-Severin County